Sovetsky Baygol (Baygol) is a rural locality (a selo) in Turochakskoye Rural Settlement of Turochaksky District, the Altai Republic, Russia. The population was 9 as of 2016. There is 1 street.

Geography 
Sovetsky Baygol is located near the Baygol River, 97 km southeast of Turochak (the district's administrative centre) by road. Kurmach-Baygol is the nearest rural locality.

References 

Rural localities in Turochaksky District